Joseph A. Foran High School is a public high school located in Milford, Connecticut. The school serves about 1,000 students in grades 9–12 in the Milford Public Schools system.

History
Opened in 1973, the school was named for former Superintendent of Schools Joseph A. Foran. It opened as the third of three high schools in Milford, including Milford High School and Jonathan Law High School. About ten years after the opening of Foran High School, Milford High School closed in 1983.  The school's motto is “Lion Pride” and the sports teams are the Foran Lions. The Foran Lion mascot is named Brutus in honor of Joseph A. Foran's grandfather Brutus P. Foran.

Sports
Fall sports include boys' and girls' cross country, football, boys' and girls' soccer, girls' swimming, and girls' volleyball.

Winter sports include boys' and girls' basketball, girls' gymnastics, boys' and girls' ice hockey, boys' swimming, boys' and girls' indoor track, and wrestling.

Spring sports include baseball, boys' and girls' golf, boys' and girls' lacrosse, boys' and girls' outdoor track, softball, girls' tennis, and boys' volleyball.

References

External links
 

Buildings and structures in Milford, Connecticut
Schools in New Haven County, Connecticut
Public high schools in Connecticut
Educational institutions established in 1973
1973 establishments in Connecticut